DZOE-TV (channel 11) is a television station in Metro Manila, Philippines, serving as the flagship of the A2Z network. It is owned by ZOE Broadcasting Network (alongside Light TV flagship DZOZ-DTV [channel 33]) and operated by ABS-CBN Corporation under a blocktime agreement. The station maintains studios at the ABS-CBN Broadcasting Center, Sgt. Esguerra Ave. corner Mo. Ignacia St., Diliman, Quezon City and 22nd floor, Strata 2000 Bldg., F. Ortigas Jr. Road (formerly Emerald Avenue), Ortigas Center, Pasig, while its hybrid analog and digital transmitting facility is located at Crestview Heights Subdivision, Brgy. San Roque, Antipolo, Rizal.

History

Prior history
The Channel 11 frequency, originally under the DWXI-TV call letters in Metro Manila, was granted to a joint venture between the leaders of two major Filipino religious movements, Mike Velarde (of the El Shaddai movement) and Eddie Villanueva (of the Jesus Is Lord Church). Disputes between the two leaders resulted in both parties wanting full control of channel 11's stake. With the intervention of the Philippine Congress, Villanueva and JIL successfully won the rights to the station. His organization paid compensation to Velarde's broadcast company Delta Broadcasting System, as part of the deal.

ZOE TV (1998–2005)
On April 13, 1998, JIL launched its own TV channel ZOE TV. Its callsign and corporate entity were renamed to reflect the channel's existence. ZOE TV broadcast independently with religious, news and public affairs, music videos, educational and lifestyle programs, as well as an amount of infomercial blocks, serving as an alternative to the major television networks that occupy the remainder of the VHF channel band. From its inception, ZOE occupies an office space, studio and master control equipment, and transmitter room at the Strata 2000 Building along the Pasig section of Ortigas Center (sharing space with Southern Broadcasting Network).

In 1999, broadcast distribution company Enternet of Mr. Benito Araneta entered into a channel lease agreement with DZOE-TV, allowing the former to simulcast CNBC Asia during channel 11's daytime hours, which later expanded to a 24/7 broadcast service. Contract disputes would lead to the agreement ending in 2002 with Enternet subsequently filing a case against Villanueva and ZOE. The ZOE TV branding remained in use throughout its era.

In 2001, ZOE TV became the first TV station to air the second EDSA Revolution that saw former president Joseph Estrada ousted by angered Anti-Estrada protesters due to various corruption allegations as well as he was violated by the 1987 Constitution.

From a 12 to 13-hour operation (which, during the CNBC on ZOE TV period, where it operated 24/7), the station reduced broadcast to just 9 hours per day from 2:00 PM to 11:00 PM in its final years of the brand.

QTV/Q/GMA News TV (2005–2019)
In April 2005, Citynet Network Marketing and Productions, Inc., a subsidiary of GMA Network, Inc., and ZOE TV entered an agreement for Citynet leasing the entire TV airtime block of the station in exchange for upgrading ZOE TV's facilities and ZOE distributing its in-house programs to GMA Network's airtime. GMA has been developing a revival of its sister television network through Citynet after its last stint as an affiliate of Channel V in 1999 but closed down in 2001 due to financial problems. And although Citynet has its own sister station in Mega Manila through DWDB-TV channel 27 (launched in 1995 as the first UHF station in the market owned by a major broadcast network), while its regional stations are cleared for reactivation, the station's old transmitter was degraded and its signal could not reach to areas normally received by GMA's flagship DZBB-TV channel 7. The agreement was believed to be seen as GMA's only alternative at that time to make sure there will be no significant loss of household viewership in the market once the sister TV network is revived.

On September 1, 2005, channel 11 quietly went off the air as GMA installed, upgraded and rehabilitated the transmitter and studio facilities of ZOE TV. At the same time, Channel 11's original 40 kW transmitter in Ortigas was decommissioned in favor of an upgraded 100 kW transmitter facility purchased by GMA located at the GMA Tower of Power site in Brgy. Culiat, Quezon City, with ZOE maintaining the license and transmitter operations for the station (due to current ownership restrictions requiring only one station per broadcaster per frequency).

On November 11, 2005, after a series of test broadcasts, GMA/Citynet finally handled master control operations of channel 11 and launched their new second TV network through ZOE TV. It started as an all-female lifestyle channel QTV (Quality TeleVision; later renamed as simply Q on March 18, 2007), then it was reformatted as a news and public affairs channel GMA News TV (now GTV) on February 28, 2011. For 14 years, channel 11's latest brands are considered as joint ventures, with ZOE and Citynet working together to reach millions of households in different factors of operation. In exchange, ZOE's in-house programs are required to be aired on both Q and GNTV every day before signing-off and after signing-on; GMA also airs these programs on weekends during off-peak times.

Through the investment of GMA/Citynet, ZOE TV resumed its independent broadcasting via UHF Channel 33 in November 2006, which became its permanent frequency ever since.

Termination of agreement and temporary suspension of broadcast (2019–2020)
On April 24, 2019, GMA/Citynet announced that it will terminate its blocktime agreement with ZOE Broadcasting by the end of May 2019. Third-party sources reported that Channel 11 would simulcast ZOE's sister station DZOZ-DTV channel 33 after the termination of the agreement, but ZOE has no official statement yet on its future plans.

GMA managed to extend GNTV's run on channel 11 until the planned conversion date of June 4. To facilitate this, GMA/Citynet and ZOE conducted the conversion into two stages: all of ZOE's in-house programs were pulled out from GMA and GNTV's programming lineup on June 3; then on June 4, as channel 11 is slated to shut off after the termination, GNTV Manila's intellectual unit (master control, sales, and employees) successfully transferred to the newly rehabilitated DWDB-TV for the remainder of the analog broadcast run. Engineers and technicians from ZOE missed the said shutoff notice of channel 11, which caused a broadcast conflict with channel 27 and the cut off to be delayed until midnight of June 5.

Return to independent broadcasting; test broadcast (2020)

On June 22, 2020, after a year of inactivity, ZOE Broadcasting Network reactivated their 100-kilowatt VHF 11 transmitter (this time, it is now relocated in Antipolo) on the air and carried the feed of Light TV as part of its test broadcast operations, but on June 26 the simulcast was replaced by Hillsong Channel, which is owned by Trinity Broadcasting Network, until July 11. It is rumored to be part of marketing the channel for either possibly continuing the analog simulcast of their sister station UHF 33 or for blocktime / channel leasing.

Blocktime with ABS-CBN; A2Z (2020–present)

Since 2017, ZOE Broadcasting Network and ABS-CBN Corporation were reportedly held talks for possible airtime lease of Channel 11 or acquisition of the network itself if the issues regarding ABS-CBN's now-expired broadcast franchise were ever floated. Reports of a blocktime agreement between ABS-CBN and ZOE begins to surface after the Congress rejected ABS-CBN franchise renewal in July 2020, with a tentative schedule offering for broadcasting 22 hours of airtime on Channel 11, and ABS-CBN programs such as Ang Probinsyano, ASAP Natin 'To!, It's Showtime, and TV Patrol were being shopped to air on ZOE TV. Eventually, all ABS-CBN News and Current Affairs programs are declined to air on Channel 11 by the ZOE management due to editorial concerns until January 1, 2022, ABS-CBN News' TV Patrol officially began the simulcast of its regular edition on Channel 11, marking its return to free-to-air television, almost two years since the newscast made its last broadcast on the original ABS-CBN Channel 2 (DWWX-TV).

On October 6, 2020, through separate statements, ABS-CBN and ZOE TV publicly announced its blocktime partnership and the rebranding of Channel 11 to A2Z, more than a year after being disaffiliated from GMA News TV and five months after ABS-CBN Channel 2 shutdown. The announcement comes a day after Sky Cable, ABS-CBN cable television arm, added ZOE TV 11 to the channel lineup. Launched on October 10, A2Z Channel 11 features entertainment shows and movies from Kapamilya Channel and educational shows from Knowledge Channel, as well as religious programs from ZOE TV's sister network Light TV, CBN Asia, and other religious blocktimers.

Digital television

UHF Channel 20 (509.143 MHz)

DZOE-TV began its presence on digital television through GMA's flagship DZBB-TV. The station's second digital subchannel is used to broadcast channel 11's programs.

GMA Manila's digital signal began operating in 2013 on then-vacated UHF channel 27 (551.143 MHz). To continue GMA Manila's digital television broadcast after the termination announcement, DZBB-TV and its GNTV subchannel are reported to transfer to UHF channel 15 (479.143 MHz), which the National Telecommunications Commission, through a memorandum circular in 2016, authorized to operate as part of NTC's plans to license digital channels 14-20 for major TV broadcasts. In late May, GMA began trial simulcasts on the new channel 15 frequency and became channel 7's sole digital channel in Mega Manila after the June 4 conversion.

Following the reactivation of its analog broadcast on Channel 11, ZOE TV began a series of test broadcast on its digital UHF channel 20, the frequency assigned to ZOE.

When A2Z was launched on October 10, 2020, the network was initially offered only on analog television as their permit for digital broadcasts is waiting for the approval of the NTC. A month later on November 12, 2020, while Metro Manila was lashing out on the onslaught of Typhoon Vamco (Ulysses), the channel finally aired on digital and become available in the Mega Manila area.

Areas of coverage

Primary areas 
 Metro Manila 
 Cavite
 Portion of Bulacan
 Portion of Laguna
 Portion of Rizal

Secondary areas 
 Portion of Pampanga
 Portion of Nueva Ecija
 Portion of Batangas
 Portion of Bataan

See also
 ZOE Broadcasting Network
 Light TV 33
 A2Z (Philippine TV channel)

References

ZOE Broadcasting Network
Television stations in Metro Manila
Television channels and stations established in 1995
Television channels and stations established in 1998
Digital television stations in the Philippines